For information on all Portland State University sports, see Portland State Vikings

The Portland State Vikings football program is the intercollegiate American football team for the Portland State University located in the U.S. state of Oregon. The team competes in the NCAA Division I Football Championship Subdivision (FCS) as a member of the Big Sky Conference. The school's first football team was fielded in 1947. The team plays its home games at the 7,600 seat Hillsboro Stadium. Viking football practice takes place on campus at the Peter W. Stott Field.

History

Classifications
 1958–1972: NCAA College Division
 1973–1977: NCAA Division II
 1978–1980: NCAA Division I-AA
 1981–1995: NCAA Division II
 1996–present: NCAA Division I-AA/FCS

Conference affiliations
 1947–1949: Independent
 1950–1964: Oregon Collegiate Conference
 1965–1972: NCAA College Division independent
 1973–1977: NCAA Division II independent
 1978–1980: NCAA Division I-AA independent
 1981: NCAA Division II independent
 1982–1992: Western Football Conference
 1993–1995: NCAA Division II independent
 1996–present: Big Sky Conference

Head coaches

† Read's combined statistics: 9 seasons, with a record of 39–52–1 (.429).

Championships

Conference championships

† Co-champions

Playoff results

Division I-AA/FCS
The Vikings have appeared in the I-AA/FCS playoffs two times. Their overall record is 0–2.

Division II
The Vikings appeared in the Division II playoffs eight times from 1987 through 1995 with an overall record of 12–8.

Rivalries

Eastern Washington

The Vikings have a rivalry with the Eastern Washington Eagles in all sports, starting in 2010 called The Dam Cup. Eastern Washington won the first rivalry match between the two schools in 2010 with a score of 55–17. The purpose of the Dam Cup is to create a rivalry between Portland State University and Eastern Washington University and provide a sense of pride between alumni in the Portland, OR and Spokane, WA areas. Other goals include increasing attendance at events between both schools and building school spirit among each institutions' student body.

‡ The Dam Cup rivalry with Portland State was officially established in 2010, but both teams have played against each other since the date listed above.

Montana

Dot's Pretzels Bowl

The Viks and the  Montana Grizzlies have played each other 46 times since the 1965 football season. Coach Bruce Barnum  and Griz coach Bobby Hauck have a friendly rivalry based in part on Hershey-owned Dot's Pretzels. The 46 matchups are the most games Portland State has played anyone. Montana is one of Portland State's two protected Big Sky Conference rivalries (along with Northern Colorado) when the conference shifted to one division in 2022, meaning they will play every year. The University of Montana leads the all-time series 33–13 as of 2022.

Idaho State

The Viks and Idaho State Bengals have played each other 45 times since 1965. Idaho State leads the series 26–18–1 as of 2022.

Retired numbers

Notes

College Football Hall of Fame

The Vikings have one player inducted into the College Football Hall of Fame.

National Award Winners

STATS FCS Coach of the Year
Bruce Barnum (2015)

Conference Award WinnersBig Sky Conference Coach of the Year'''
Bruce Barnum (2015)

Notable former players

Notable alumni include:

 Orshawante Bryant
 Sammie Burroughs
 Kameron Canaday
 Tony Curtis
 Clint Didier
 Tracey Eaton
 Adam Hayward
 Darick Holmes
 James Hundon
 Reggie Jones
 June Jones
 Rich Lewis
 Neil Lomax
 Antonio Narcisse
 Patrick Onwuasor
 Steve Papin
 Ted Popson
 Jordan Senn
 DeShawn Shead
 Dave Stief
 Julius Thomas
 Danny Urrego 
 Juston Wood
 Aaron Woods

References

External links
 

 
American football teams established in 1947
1947 establishments in Oregon